Best of the 'B' Sides is a compilation of B-sides by the British heavy metal band Iron Maiden, released on 4 November 2002 as part of the Eddie's Archive box set. Each track was remastered and the set came with a running commentary from Rod Smallwood. It covers all of their singles from their first (1980's "Running Free") to 2000's "Out of the Silent Planet", although several of the band's original B-sides were excluded from the collection: "Total Eclipse" (from "Run to the Hills", 1982, although this has been added to the album The Number of the Beast from 1998 onwards), "Mission From 'Arry" (from "2 Minutes to Midnight", 1984); "Bayswater Ain't a Bad Place to Be" (from "Be Quick or Be Dead", 1992); and "I Live My Way" (from "Man on the Edge", 1995). Also missing are the band's cover of Thin Lizzy's "Massacre" (from "Can I Play with Madness", 1988) and a number of live B-sides.

The album is described on the band's website as "a collection that not only reveals much about the band as individuals and the inherent character of the band, but also provides a real insight into who and where their influences came from."

Track listing

Disc One

Disc Two

Personnel
Production and performance credits are adapted from the album liner notes.
Iron Maiden
Steve Harris – bass guitar, producer (disc 2, tracks 5–7 and 9–14)
Dave Murray – guitar
Doug Sampson – drums (disc 1, track 1)
Paul Di'Anno – lead vocals (disc 1, tracks 1–3)
Dennis Stratton – guitar (disc 1, tracks 2 and 3)
Clive Burr – drums (disc 1, tracks 2–4)
Adrian Smith – guitar (disc 1, tracks 4–15; disc 2, tracks 15 and 16), lead vocals (disc 1, track 9)
Bruce Dickinson – lead vocals (disc 1, tracks 4–8 and 10–15; disc 2, tracks 1–8, 15 and 16), backing vocals (disc 1, track 9)
Nicko McBrain – drums (disc 1, tracks 5–15; disc 2)
Janick Gers – guitar (disc 2)
Blaze Bayley – lead vocals (disc 2, tracks 9–14)
Production
Guy Edwards – producer (disc 1, track 1)
Will Malone – producer (disc 1, track 2)
"Iron Maiden" – producer (disc 1, track 3; disc 2, tracks 15 and 16)
Martin Birch – producer (disc 1, tracks 4–15; disc 2, tracks 1–8)
Nigel Green – producer (disc 2, tracks 9–12)
Mark Wilkinson – cover illustration
Nick Watson – mastering
Rod Smallwood – management
Andy Taylor – management
Merck Mercuriadis – management

References 

B-side compilation albums
Iron Maiden compilation albums
2002 compilation albums
Heavy metal compilation albums